Rawsonia burtt-davyi is a species of plant in the Achariaceae family. It is endemic to Malawi.

References

burtt-davyi
Vulnerable plants
Endemic flora of Malawi
Taxonomy articles created by Polbot